Vernon Abeysekera was a Sri Lankan civil servant. He was the former Postmaster General, Director of Radio Ceylon and Government Agent.

He was educated at Royal College, Colombo and went to the University College Colombo, then an affiliated University of London. Thereafter he joined the Ceylon Civil Service and went on to serve as Government Agent of Polonnaruwa and Galle. Thereafter he was appointed as Director of Radio Ceylon and thereafter went on to serve five years in the Ceylon High Commission in London. On his return he was appointed as Government Agent of Jaffna. In 1969 he was appointed as Postmaster General and served until his retirement in 1970, after which he moved to Australia.

Bibliography

References

Sinhalese civil servants
Postmasters General of Sri Lanka
Alumni of University of London Worldwide
Alumni of the University of London
Alumni of the Ceylon University College
Alumni of Royal College, Colombo
Sri Lankan emigrants to Australia
Year of birth missing
Year of death missing